St Michael's Church, Birchover, also known as Rowtor Chapel, is a Grade II listed parish church in the Church of England in Birchover, Derbyshire. Located in the Peak District National Park, St Michael was built as a privately endowed chapel for the nearby Rowtor Hall.

History
On his death in 1717, he left an endowment of £20 a week for a chaplain to keep the Common Prayer service twice a day, "and administer the Sacrament every Sun-day". St Michael's was rebuilt in 1864, and expanded with the addition of the chancel. The church is unusual in that there are windows only on two sides, the south and east; the north elevation is blank. The walls contain fragments of an earlier Norman church which had stood in the neighbouring village of Uppertown. 

The east window was fitted with stained glass in 1898 and made by Alfred D. Hemming of London, and the chancel floor was renovated by the Ashford Marble Works. The windows to the south side have stained glass designed by the painter Brian Clarke in 1977. The artworks, comprising three two-light windows, were fabricated for the church and donated to it by the artist, who had lived in Rowtor Hall, the vicarage, between 1975 and 1977.

Parish status
The church is part of the Youlgreave Beneice, and is in a joint parish with
 Holy Trinity Church, Stanton-in-Peak
 St Michael and All Angels’ Church, Middleton-by-Youlgreave
 All Saints’ Church, Youlgreave

Organ
The organ was installed by Wadsworth and Brothers and was opened on 29 January 1905. A specification of the organ can be found on the National Pipe Organ Register.

See also

Listed buildings in Birchover

References

Church of England church buildings in Derbyshire
Grade II listed churches in Derbyshire